Edgar Fidel Cáceres (born June 6, 1964) is a former Major League Baseball second baseman and switch-hitter who played for the Kansas City Royals as a replacement player during the 1995 season.

In a 55-game career, Cáceres batted .239 with one home run, 17 RBI, 13 runs, six doubles, two triples and two stolen bases.

See also
 List of Major League Baseball players from Venezuela

External links

Baseball Gauge
Retrosheet
Pura Pelota – Venezuelan League statistics

1964 births
Living people
Birmingham Barons players
Doosan Bears players
El Paso Diablos players
Gulf Coast Dodgers players
Jacksonville Expos players
KBO League infielders
Kansas City Royals players
Leones del Caracas players
Major League Baseball second basemen
Major League Baseball players from Venezuela
Minor league baseball managers
New Orleans Zephyrs players
Omaha Royals players
Sportspeople from Barquisimeto
Rockford Expos players
Sarasota White Sox players
Tampa White Sox players
Vancouver Canadians players
Venezuelan expatriate baseball players in Canada
Venezuelan expatriate baseball players in South Korea
Venezuelan expatriate baseball players in the United States
West Palm Beach Expos players